Grande Fratello 13 was the thirteenth season of the Italian version of the reality show franchise Big Brother. The show premieres on 3 March 2014 and concluded on 26 May 2014. Alessia Marcuzzi returned as the main host of the show.

Veronica Graf was one of four international Big Brother alumni up for a public vote to compete in the fourth season of Big Brother Canada, but was not selected to enter the house.

Housemates

Nominations table

Notes
 At February 22, four potential housemates (Diletta, Eithel, Lorenzo and Enzo) were presented to the public. Between these four, only one would win the status of an official housemate. One day before the launch, at March 2, Enzo was ejected from the competition after breaking some of the rules. Later during the launch, it was revealed that Eithel received the fewest votes, and was eliminated. Finally, Diletta was the most voted, with 65% of the votes, and entered as an official housemate.
 On round 1 male contestants nominated men, and female contestants nominated women but as Armando & Giuseppe lived first week with female contestants, they could nominate women. Fabio and Veronica entered as new housemates, so they were exempt of nominating and be nominated.
 On week 6, Greta, the evicted housemate had to save a housemate and she saved Angela and then she saved Valentina, she saved Diletta. Diletta saved Roberto and he saved Andrea then he saved Mia and then she saved Mirco. Mirco saved Samba who saved Armando & Giuseppe and they saved Modestina who saved Giovanni and he finally saved Chicca meaning Fabio was evicted but he will live at the cantina where next week people voted to save him or not.
 On week 7, Fabio was already nominated as he was not chosen by the housemates. Armando & Giuseppe were nominated and they faced eviction along Fabio.
 On week 8, after Valentina was evicted she was able to nominate.
 On week 9, there was a double eviction where the male housemate with most votes from females would face nomination with the female housemate with more votes from males. Diletta and Fabio received most votes from each gender and were nominated.
 On week 10, the housemates chose who they wanted to be the first finalist. Samba received 2 votes so he became the first finalist of the season and he is exempt from the rest of nominations.
 On week 11, Samba was asked if he wanted to keep his immunity or give it to another housemate. He chose to give it to Giovanni.
 On week 11, there was a tie between Chicca and Modestina. Angela, as she had more votes had to break it choosing Modestina. Since now, the public vote will be to vote for the finalist and not to evict.
 As Giovanni and Modestina were already finalists they were not eligible to nominate.
 Angela, Mirco and Samba were nominated and the one with most votes would become the fourth finalist.
 Angela and Samba were the last non-finalist housemates so they were nominated to be the last finalist.
 At the final round, the public voted for the winner.

References

 Official site 

2014 Italian television seasons
13